Yeongdeok station is a railway station of the Donghae Line in Yeongdeok County, North Gyeongsang, South Korea.

External links
 Yeongdeok Station

Railway stations in North Gyeongsang Province
Korail stations
Railway stations opened in 2018
Yeongdeok County